What follows is a chronological table that sets out the changes in the composition of the First Presidency of the Church of Jesus Christ of Latter-day Saints (LDS Church) through time.

See also

Chronology of the Quorum of the Twelve Apostles (LDS Church)
List of members of the Quorum of the Twelve Apostles (LDS Church)
List of presidents of the Church of Jesus Christ of Latter-day Saints
President of the Church (LDS Church)

Notes

First Presidency
Chronology